Jill Susan Eikenberry (born January 21, 1947) is an American film, stage, and television actress. She is known for her role as lawyer Ann Kelsey on the NBC drama L.A. Law (1986–94), for which she is a five-time Emmy Award and four-time Golden Globe Award nominee, winning the Golden Globe for Best Actress in a Drama Series in 1989. She received an Obie Award in 1986 for the Off-Broadway plays Lemon Sky and Life Under Water, and was nominated for a 2011 Drama Desk Award for the Off-Broadway musical The Kid. Her film appearances include Hide in Plain Sight (1980), Arthur (1981) and The Manhattan Project (1986).

Life and career
Eikenberry was born in New Haven, Connecticut, and was raised in Madison, Wisconsin and St. Joseph and Kansas City, Missouri. She began studies in anthropology at Barnard College of Columbia University but in her second year she auditioned for and was accepted into the Yale School of Drama.

She met Michael Tucker at the Arena Stage in Washington, D.C., where they appeared together in The Night Thoreau Spent in Jail (1970) and Moonchildren (1971), the latter of which transferred to Broadway in 1972. She married Tucker in 1973 and they settled in New York City. She has a son, Max, and a stepdaughter, actress Allison Tucker (by Michael's first marriage).

Her first role in film was a minor role in the television movie, They've Killed President Lincoln (1971). Among her early feature films was Between the Lines (1977), directed by Joan Micklin Silver. She and Michael Tucker had small roles in Lina Wertmüller's 1978 success A Night Full of Rain, and she also appeared in An Unmarried Woman starring Jill Clayburgh the same year.

Throughout the 1970s, Eikenberry's main focus was on theater. She made her Broadway debut in 1974 in All Over Town, and later appeared Off-Broadway in Uncommon Women and Others, which was later filmed for American public television. She also starred in the musical Onward Victoria (1980), which closed on opening night.

The 1980s saw a number of television films to her credit, and a major film success, Dudley Moore's star vehicle Arthur (1981). In 1986, she and Michael Tucker scored a major success by each securing major parts in the successful television series L.A. Law. They were given the roles by producer Steven Bochco, who had been impressed by the pair when he used them for two episodes on his earlier hit Hill Street Blues. For her performance, Eikenberry received five Primetime Emmy Awards nominations, and four Golden Globe Award for Best Actress – Television Series Drama, winning in 1989. Jill and Michael moved to Hollywood at this time, and it was in this period that Jill discovered she had breast cancer, which was successfully treated over the next two years.

The event was significant in her life. In 1989, she co-produced a documentary for NBC television called Destined to Live, which featured interviews with cancer survivors like herself, including Nancy Reagan. She remains an activist for breast cancer research and early detection.

Eikenberry continued to appear in television movies over the next decade, while continuing her role on L.A. Law. With the financial success accruing from their L.A. Law work, Jill and Michael produced a number of television movies as vehicles in which they appeared together. They include Assault and Matrimony (1987), The Secret Life of Archie's Wife (1990), A Town Torn Apart (1992) and Gone in a Heartbeat (1996).

Since L.A. Law'''s run ended in 1994, her film and television appearances have been sporadic. One of her more recent roles was in the comedy Manna from Heaven (2003), in which she appeared with Cloris Leachman and Shirley Jones.

She has sung on stage and in films, and in recent years, she and her husband have written a number of songs. They currently reside in New York and Umbria.

After meeting artist Emile Norman, Eikenberry and Tucker purchased land from him to become his neighbors in Big Sur, California. Becoming friends with him, they produced a 2008 PBS documentary, Emile Norman: By His Own Design. 
Eikenberry guest starred on Numb3rs in 2008, Law & Order in 2009 and Body of Proof (Episode: "Broken Home") in 2011. She played mothers on lead characters in films Suburban Girl (2007), Something Borrowed (2011) and Young Adult (2011). In March, 2015 Eikenberry co-starred with Tucker in The M Spot, a play written by Tucker and presented at the New Jersey Repertory Company.

In 2022, Eikenberry returned to her Ann Kelsey role in the ABC revival pilot of L.A. Law''.

Filmography

Film

Television

Awards and nominations

References

External links

The Official Website for Jill Eikenberry and Michael Tucker

Bio from Hollywood.com
BroadwayWorld.com interview with Jill Eikenberry, June 5, 2007

American stage actresses
American film actresses
American television actresses
Best Drama Actress Golden Globe (television) winners
Living people
Yale School of Drama alumni
Barnard College alumni
Actresses from Wisconsin
Actresses from New Haven, Connecticut
Actors from Madison, Wisconsin
20th-century American actresses
21st-century American actresses
1947 births